J.C. Price High School, also known as the Joseph Charles Price High School, is a historic high school complex located at Salisbury, Rowan County, North Carolina. The school served as Salisbury's high school for African-American students from 1932 through the 1968–1969 school year. It was listed on the National Register of Historic Places in 2010.

J. C. Price High School was originally housed in the Monroe Street School. The Rosenwald Fund supported the construction of a school building with a grant of $5,300. A gymnasium was built in 1951, a classroom building was built parallel to the original building in 1956–1957, and cafeteria in 1956-1957

The complex consists of four symmetrically positioned one-story brick buildings built between 1931 and 1957.  The original building was built in 1931–1932, and is an "H"-shaped, Colonial Revival style brick building.

References

High schools in North Carolina
Rosenwald schools in North Carolina
School buildings on the National Register of Historic Places in North Carolina
Colonial Revival architecture in North Carolina
School buildings completed in 1932
Schools in Rowan County, North Carolina
National Register of Historic Places in Rowan County, North Carolina
1932 establishments in North Carolina